Otocephala is a clade of ray-finned fishes within the infraclass Teleostei that evolved some 230 million years ago. It is named for the presence of a hearing (otophysic) link from the swimbladder to the inner ear. Other names proposed for the group include Ostarioclupeomorpha and Otomorpha.

The clade contains Clupeiformes (herrings) and Ostariophysi, a group of other orders including Cypriniformes (minnows and allies), Gymnotiformes (knifefish), and Siluriformes (catfish). Otocephala may also contain Alepocephaliformes (slickheads), but as yet (2016) without morphological evidence.

The clade is sister to Euteleostei which contains the majority of bony fish alive today.

In 2015, Benton and colleagues set a "plausible minimum" date for the origin of crown Otocephala as about 228.4 million years ago. They argued that since the oldest locality for any diversity of stem teleosts is the Carnian of Polberg bei Lunz, Austria, whose base is 235 million years old, a rough estimate for Otocephala can be made.

Taxonomy
Taxonomy based on:

 Cohort Otocephala Johnson & Patterson 1996 [Otomorpha Wiley & Johnson 2010; Ostarioclupeomorpha Arratia 1997]
 Genus †Kermichthys Taverne 1993 
 Family †Lycoclupeidae Gowda 1968
 Family †Clupavidae Bertin & Arambourg 1958
 Subcohort Clupei Wiley & Johnson 2010 [Clupeomorpha Greenwood et al. 1966]
 Order †Ellimmichthyiformes Grande 1982
 Order Clupeiformes Bleeker 1859
 Subcohort Alepocephali
 Order Alepocephaliformes Marshall 1962
 Subcohort Ostariophysi Sagemehl 1885
 Genus †Tischlingerichthys Arratia 1997 
 Family †Ancylostylidae Jordan 1923 
 Family †Erythrinolepididae Cockerell 1919 corrig. 
 Section Anotophysa (Rosen & Greenwood 1970) Sagemehl 1885 [Anotophysi Rosen & Greenwood 1970]
 Order †Sorbininardiformes Taverne 1999
 Order Gonorynchiformes Regan 1909
 Section Otophysa (Rosen & Greenwood 1970) Sagemehl 1885 [Otophysi Rosen & Greenwood 1970]
 Genus †Nardonoides Mayrinck, Brito & Otero 2014 
 Family †Chanoididae Taverne 2005 
 Family †Salminopsidae Gayet 1985 
 Superorder Cypriniphysae [Cypriniphysi Woodward 1901]
 Order Cypriniformes Bleeker 1859 sensu Goodrich 1909
 Superorder Characiphysae (Fink & Fink 1981)
 Order Characiformes Goodrich 1909
 Superorder Siluriphysae [Siluriphysi]
 Order Gymnotiformes Berg 1940 (Neotropical knifefishes)
 Order Siluriformes Cuvier 1817 sensu Hay 1929 (catfishes)

Phylogeny
Phylogeny of living groups based on:

References 

 

 
Cohorts